Svetlov may refer to 
3483 Svetlov, inner main-belt asteroid 
Boris Svetlov, Russian film director and actor
Mikhail Arkadyevich Svetlov, Russian/Soviet poet 
Mikhail Svetlov, Russian/American opera singer 
Mikhail Svetlov, Russian bass singer
Sergei Svetlov, ice hockey player